Rocky Fork is a stream in the U.S. state of Ohio. It is a tributary of the Licking River.

Rocky Fork was descriptively named for the boulders along its course.

See also
List of rivers of Ohio

References

Rivers of Knox County, Ohio
Rivers of Licking County, Ohio
Rivers of Ohio